OneBodyOneFaith, formerly the Lesbian and Gay Christian Movement (LGCM), describes itself as "UK-based international Charity which challenges homophobia and transphobia, especially within the Church and faith based organisations".

History
The Gay Christian Movement was founded in 1976 at St Botolph's Aldgate, and the Revd Richard Kirker was its first general secretary. In 1977, local chapters were organised, followed in 1978 by the Women's Group, the Evangelical Fellowship in 1979 and Young Lesbian and Gay Christians in 2000. The name was eventually changed to the Lesbian and Gay Christian Movement in 1987. The twentieth-anniversary event, held on 16 November 1996 at Southwark Cathedral with John Gladwin, then Bishop of Guildford, as preacher, was the first Anglican cathedral service in Britain held for gay people. Over 2,000 people attended. About 50 local churches held vigils in protest.

The Anglican churches in the British Isles are the main focus of LGCM activity, but its membership and interests are nonetheless entirely ecumenical and international.

The movement has criticised Pope Benedict XVI over his statement that gender theory could lead to the "self-destruction" of humanity. The Reverend Sharon Ferguson, then chief executive of the LGCM, called the statement "totally irresponsible and unacceptable... When you have religious leaders like that making that sort of statement then followers feel they are justified in behaving in an aggressive and violent way." When Benedict visited the United Kingdom, the movement criticised secular protesters, urging people to "disagree with respect", calling the protests "unhelpful and counterproductive" and holding a prayer vigil.

Present day
In June 2017, LGCM changed its name to OneBodyOneFaith. The current chief executive is Tracey Byrne. The movement's headquarters are located in Newark-on-Trent. The current Chair is the Venerable Peter Leonard, Archdeacon of the Isle of Wight and the Vice-Chair is Jarel Robinson-Brown, Associate Chaplain of King's College London.

See also

Homosexuality and Christianity
History of Christianity and homosexuality
The Bible and homosexuality
List of Christian denominational positions on homosexuality
Anglican views of homosexuality
Homosexuality in the Roman Catholic priesthood
Gay bishops
Jeffrey John (Dean of St Albans)
Gene Robinson (Bishop of New Hampshire)
The "Soho masses" at the Church of Our Lady of the Assumption and St Gregory

References

External links
LGCM website. Archived in 2011
Outcome (formerly the LGCM Methodist Caucus)
Young Lesbian and Gay Christians
Evangelical Fellowship for Lesbian and Gay Christians
Changing Attitude
Gay Christian Network
ChristianGays.com
Whosoever Magazine website (the first online magazine for GLBT Christians founded in 1996)

Christian movements
LGBT Christian organizations
LGBT and Christianity
LGBT organisations in the United Kingdom
LGBT history in the United Kingdom
Christian organizations established in 1976
1976 establishments in the United Kingdom